Robbie Nairn (born 18 February 1997) is a Scotland 7s international rugby union player who plays for Ayrshire Bulls. His usual position is at the wing position.

Rugby union career

Amateur career

Nairn started his rugby union career playing with Currie. As part of the Currie U15 side they won the Edinburgh and District League and Cup in the 2011-12 season. A year later the Currie U16 won the similar honours.

He entered the Scottish Rugby Academy at the Stage 3 professional phase of the academy in the 2017-18 season.

Nairn has been drafted to Ayr in the Scottish Premiership for the 2018-19 season.

Professional career

Nairn joined Harlequins in 2015. He was loaned out to Esher for game time  and then loaned out to London Welsh.

Nairn was enrolled in the BT Sport Scottish Rugby Academy as a Stage 3 player. Stage 3 players are aligned to a professional club and given regional support. Nairn was assigned to Glasgow Warriors.

He made his debut for Glasgow Warriors in their opening match of the 2017-18 season - against Northampton Saints at Bridgehaugh Park, Stirling on 19 August 2017.

Nairn graduated from the Scottish Rugby Academy to earn a professional contract with Glasgow Warriors on 7 June 2018. He has earned a one year deal with the club.

He made his first appearance for the 2018-19 season for the Warriors in their 50 -17 demolition of Harlequins at North Inch, Perth on 18 August 2018.

He was signed by Ayrshire Bulls on 22 June 2021.

International career

Nairn played for Scotland U18 and was then picked for the Scotland U20 side despite still being eligible for the U18s.

He has been capped for Scotland 7s in 2016.

References

External links
 Scotland U20 player profile
 
 Scotlands' Robbie Nairn scores from own 22 - YouTube

1997 births
Living people
Scottish rugby union players
Glasgow Warriors players
Harlequin F.C. players
Esher RFC players
Currie RFC players
Scotland international rugby sevens players
London Welsh RFC players
Male rugby sevens players
Ayr RFC players
Rugby union centres
Rugby union wings
Rugby union players from Livingston, West Lothian